Mount Queen Bess is one of the principal summits of the Pacific Ranges of the Coast Mountains of southern British Columbia.  It stands west of Chilko Lake and to the south of Tatlayoko Lake, and crowns a peak-studded ridge to the north of the Homathko Icefield.

The mountain is named for Queen Elizabeth I of England.  Relatively nearby is Mount Raleigh, named for Sir Walter Raleigh.  Other peaks in the vicinity of Queen Bess bear similar Elizabethan-related names: Pembroke, Silver Swan, Oriana, Armada, Grenville, Burghley, Howard, Walsingham, Cambridge, Cloister, Saint John, Galleon, and Monmouth.  Between Queen Bess and Chilko Lake is Mount Good Hope, and northwest across the Homathko is the Waddington Range, site of the highest peak in the Coast Mountains, and the highest entirely within British Columbia, Mount Waddington.

See also
 Mountain peaks of Canada
 Mountain peaks of North America
 Royal eponyms in Canada

References

External links
 "Mount Queen Bess, British Columbia" on Peakbagger

Three-thousanders of British Columbia
Pacific Ranges
Range 2 Coast Land District